The New Malatya Stadium is a stadium in Malatya, Turkey. It was opened to public in 2017 with a capacity of 25,745 spectators. It is the new home of Yeni Malatyaspor, currently playing in the TFF First League. It has replaced the club's former home, Malatya İnönü Stadium.

References

Football venues in Turkey
Sports venues completed in 2017
Sport in Malatya
2017 establishments in Turkey